Laura Siņutkina (born 13 February 2003) is a Latvian footballer who plays as a goalkeeper for FS Metta and the Latvia women's national team.

References

2003 births
Living people
Latvian women's footballers
Women's association football goalkeepers
Latvia women's youth international footballers
Latvia women's international footballers